Alejandro Barbudo Lorenzo (born 26 May 2001), commonly known as Barbu, is a Spanish footballer who plays as a central defender for CD Mirandés.

Club career
Born in Leganés, Community of Madrid, Barbu represented Atlético Madrid, Getafe CF and AD Alcorcón as a youth. He made his senior debut with the latter's reserves on 1 September 2019, starting in a 2–2 Tercera División home draw against DAV Santa Ana.

On 11 July 2021, after establishing himself as a regular starter for Alcorcón B, Barbu was loaned to Primera División RFEF side Real Unión for the season. He was a first-choice during the most of the campaign, as his side narrowly missed out a play-off spot.

On 29 July 2022, Barbu signed a three-year contract with CD Mirandés in Segunda División. He made his professional debut on 22 October, starting in a 1–1 home draw against SD Huesca.

Barbu scored his first professional goal on 21 November 2022, netting his team's second in a 2–1 home win over FC Cartagena.

References

External links

2001 births
Living people
People from Leganés
Footballers from the Community of Madrid
Spanish footballers
Association football defenders
Segunda División players
Primera Federación players
Tercera División players
AD Alcorcón B players
Real Unión footballers
CD Mirandés footballers